Manuel Hiemer (born 3 February 1985) is a German retired footballer.

References

External links

1985 births
Living people
SpVgg Greuther Fürth players
FC Ingolstadt 04 players
SSV Jahn Regensburg players
FC Erzgebirge Aue players
2. Bundesliga players
3. Liga players
Sportspeople from Augsburg
Association football midfielders
German footballers
Footballers from Bavaria